Skender is a male given name.

Skender may also refer to:

People 
Skënder Gjinushi (born 1949), Albanian politician
Skënder Hyseni (born 1955), Foreign Minister of the Republic of Kosovo
Skender Kulenović (1910–1978), Yugoslav poet, novelist and dramatist of Bosniak origin
Skender Pasha (fl. 1478–1504), Bosnian sanjakbey
Skënder Temali (born 1946), Albanian writer, poet, prozator, journalist
Skënder Zogu (born 1933), Albanian author and member of the Royal Family
Gabrijela Skender (born 1999), Croatian cross-country skier
Marin Skender (born 1979), Croatian football goalkeeper

Places 
Skenderaj, a city and municipality in Kosovo
Skender Vakuf, a town and municipality in central Bosnia and Herzegovina

Other 
Korçë Skënder, a currency used 1921–1926 in the Albanian city of Korçë

See also
 
 Alexander
 Iskandar (disambiguation)
 İskender (disambiguation)
 Sikandar (disambiguation)
 Skanderbeg (disambiguation)
 Skenderija, a neighborhood in the city of Sarajevo in Bosnia and Herzegovina